Got the Thirst is the fourth album by London 'wildstyle' band King Prawn. It was released in 2003.

Track listing
"Bring Down the House"
"The Dominant View"
"Caught Inna Rut"
"Smoke Some Shit"
"The Loneliest Life"
"Hell Below"
"Bitter Taste"
"Raise the Banner"
"Lick of the Flame"
"Gather Round"
"Satan's Folly"
"Another Great Escape"
"Viva Devi"
"If Dawn Comes...We Ride"

External links
myspace.com/originalkingprawn
Golf Records profile of King Prawn
King Prawn interview

King Prawn (band) albums
2003 albums